Super Mario Advance is a series of video game ports for Nintendo's Game Boy Advance:
 Super Mario Advance, a 2001 port of Super Mario Bros. 2
 Super Mario Advance 2, a 2001 port of Super Mario World
 Super Mario Advance 3, a 2002 port of Super Mario World 2: Yoshi's Island
 Super Mario Advance 4, a 2003 port of Super Mario Bros. 3

Nintendo franchises
Mario video games